Old Perry County Courthouse, also known as Rome Schoolhouse, is a historic courthouse located in Tobin Township, Perry County, Indiana.  The building is located near the center of the community of Rome, Indiana. It was built in 1818, and is a two-story, square brick building with a hipped roof topped by a central cupola. The building served as the seat of county government until 1859.  It then housed a school until 1966.

It was listed on the National Register of Historic Places in 1981.

References

County courthouses in Indiana
Courthouses on the National Register of Historic Places in Indiana
Government buildings completed in 1818
Buildings and structures in Perry County, Indiana
National Register of Historic Places in Perry County, Indiana
1818 establishments in Indiana